Today was a national newspaper in the United Kingdom that was published between 1986 and 1995.

History
Today, with the American newspaper USA Today as an inspiration, launched on Tuesday 4 March 1986, with the front-page headline, "Second Spy Inside GCHQ". At 18p (equivalent to p in ), it was a middle-market tabloid, a rival to the long-established Daily Mail and Daily Express. It pioneered computer photo-typesetting and full-colour offset printing at a time when national newspapers were still using Linotype machines, letterpress and could only reproduce photographs in black and white. The colour was initially crude, produced on equipment which had no facility for colour proofing, so the first view of the colour was on the finished product. However, it forced the conversion of all UK national newspapers to electronic production and colour printing. The newspaper's motto, hung in the newsroom, was "propa truth, not propaganda".

Launched by regional newspaper entrepreneur Eddy Shah, it was bought by Tiny Rowland's conglomerate Lonrho within four months. Shah subsequently launched the short-lived, unsuccessful national tabloid The Post in 1988. Alastair Campbell was political editor and his girlfriend, Fiona Millar, was news editor.

Alongside the daily newspaper, a Sunday edition was launched. Sunday Today suffered from having three editors in less than a year, and was closed early in 1987 as a cost-saving measure.

The newspaper began a sponsorship of the English Football League at the start of 1986–87, but withdrew after a season. Today was sold to Rupert Murdoch's News International in 1987.

Today ceased publication on 17 November 1995, the first long-running national newspaper title to close since the Daily Sketch in 1971. The last edition's headline was 'Goodbye, it's been great to know you". The editorial said: "Now we are forced into silence by the granite and unforgiving face of the balance sheet".

Richard Stott was editor when Today ceased publication; he died in July 2007. Other journalists at the close included Peter Prendergast (city editor), Anne Robinson (columnist), Barry Wigmore (US editor, based in New York), David McMaster (managing editor) and the MP Tony Banks (football correspondent).

Controversies

In the immediate aftermath of the 1995 Oklahoma City bombing, the paper showed a fireman carrying the body of a young girl under the headline "In the name of Islam", however it was found that the bombing had been perpetrated by two anti-government white supremasists.

In 1996, Hugh Grant won damages from News UK over what his lawyers called a "highly defamatory" article in January 1995. The newspaper had falsely claimed that Grant verbally abused a young extra with a "foul-mouthed tongue lashing" on the set of The Englishman Who Went Up a Hill But Came Down a Mountain.

Editors of Today

1985: Brian MacArthur
1987: Dennis Hackett
1987: David Montgomery
1991: Martin Dunn
1993: Richard Stott

Editors of Sunday Today
1986: Anthony Holden
1986: Peter McKay
1986: Bill Hagerty

References

Defunct newspapers published in the United Kingdom
Newspapers established in 1986
Publications disestablished in 1995
1986 establishments in the United Kingdom
1995 disestablishments in the United Kingdom